María Martín (born 26 May 1970 in León) is a retired Spanish rhythmic gymnast.

She competed for Spain in the rhythmic gymnastics all-around competition at the 1988 Summer Olympics in Seoul. She was 16th in the qualification and advanced to the final, placing 20th overall.

References

External links 
 
 

1970 births
Living people
Spanish rhythmic gymnasts
Gymnasts at the 1988 Summer Olympics
Olympic gymnasts of Spain
Sportspeople from León, Spain